Gwyneth Paltrow is an American actress and singer who has received various awards and nominations, including an Academy Award, a Golden Globe Award, a Primetime Emmy Award, and two Screen Actors Guild Awards.

Paltrow rose to international fame with her portrayal of Viola de Lesseps in the romantic period comedy-drama film Shakespeare in Love (1998), which earned her many accolades, including the Academy Award for Best Actress, as well as the Golden Globe Award for Best Actress in a Comedy, the Screen Actors Guild Award for Best Actress, and a nomination for the BAFTA Award for Best Actress in a Leading Role. For her performance in the film Proof (2005), she was nominated for the Golden Globe Award for Best Actress in a Drama, and for the romantic drama film Two Lovers (2008), she was nominated for the Independent Spirit Award for Best Female Lead. From 2008 to 2019, Paltrow portrayed Pepper Potts in the Marvel Cinematic Universe, which earned her nominations for a Critics' Choice Movie Award, a Saturn Award, and two People's Choice Awards among others.

In 2011, she starred as Holly Holliday on the musical comedy-drama television series Glee, which won her the Primetime Emmy Award for Outstanding Guest Actress in a Comedy Series. She was also nominated for a Grammy Award for Best Spoken Word Album for Children for the children's audiobook Brown Bear and Friends (2008).

Awards and nominations

Notes

References

External links 
  

Awards and nominations
Paltrow, Gwyneth